The 1969 Detroit Lions season was the 40th season in franchise history. The Lions enjoyed their best season in seven years, and their first winning campaign since 1964 by finishing in second place in the NFL Central Division with a solid 9–4–1 record led by a stingy defense that only allowed 188 total points on the season. However, the Lions still failed to qualify for the postseason for the 12th straight season. The Lions were the only team to lose to the Pittsburgh Steelers, doing so in week 1 of the season. Pittsburgh lost their remaining 13 games. The loss to the Steelers proved costly to the Lions as it served as a big blow to their playoff hopes.

Offseason

NFL Draft 

Notes

 Detroit traded its first-round selection (8th) and QB Milt Plum, P/WR Pat Studstill and RB Tommy Watkins to Los Angeles in exchange for QB Bill Munson and the Rams' third-round selection (73rd).
 Detroit traded DT Roger Brown to Los Angeles in exchange for the Rams' second-round selection (47th) and first- and third-round selections in 1968.
 Detroit traded QB Karl Sweetan to New Orleans in exchange for the Saints' third-round selection (59th).
 Detroit traded its third-round selection (60th), fourth-round selection in 1970 and S Bruce Maher to N.Y. Giants in exchange for RB Bill Triplett and LB Bill Swain.
 Detroit traded the third-round selection received from the Rams (73rd) to St. Louis in exchange for WR Billy Gambrell.
 Detroit traded its fourth-round selection (86th) and third-round selection (65th) in 1968 to San Francisco in exchange for RB David Kopay.
 Detroit traded its sixth- and seventh-round selections (138th) and (164th) to Atlanta in exchange for DT Chuck Sieminski and LB Andy Bowling.

Roster

Regular season

Schedule

Season summary

Week 11 vs Vikings 

 Muddy field
 Largest crowd for Thanksgiving game in Detroit history

Standings

Awards and records

References 

 Detroit Lions on Pro Football Reference
 Detroit Lions on jt-sw.com
 Detroit Lions on The Football Database

Detroit Lions
Detroit Lions seasons
Detroit Lions